James Mulvaney (27 April 1921 – June 1993) was a Scottish professional footballer who played as a defender.

Career
Born in Airdrie, Mulvaney played for Dumbarton, Luton Town, Brighton & Hove Albion, Bradford City, Bath City, Halifax Town and Forfar Athletic.

References

1921 births
1993 deaths
Scottish footballers
Dumbarton F.C. players
Luton Town F.C. players
Brighton & Hove Albion F.C. players
Bradford City A.F.C. players
Bath City F.C. players
Halifax Town A.F.C. players
Forfar Athletic F.C. players
Scottish Football League players
English Football League players
Association football defenders